= Epanodos =

Figure of speech

Epanodos is a figure of speech used when the same word or two similar words are repeated within a passage of text.
